Dawn Michelle Staley (born May 4, 1970) is an American basketball Hall of Fame player and coach, who is currently the head coach for the South Carolina Gamecocks. Staley won three Olympic gold medals with Team USA as a player and later was head coach of another U.S. gold-medal winning team. Staley was elected to carry the United States flag at the opening ceremony of the 2004 Summer Olympics. After playing point guard for the University of Virginia under Debbie Ryan, and winning the gold medal at the 1996 Summer Olympics, she went on to play professionally in the American Basketball League and the WNBA. In 2011, fans named Staley one of the Top 15 players in WNBA history. Staley was inducted into the Women's Basketball Hall of Fame in 2012. She was elected to the Naismith Memorial Basketball Hall of Fame in 2013.

While still a WNBA player, she started coaching the Temple University Owls women's basketball team in 2000. In eight years at Temple, she led the program to six NCAA tournaments, three regular season conference championships, and four conference tournament titles.

On May 7, 2008, she was named head coach for women's basketball at the University of South Carolina. Staley built South Carolina from the ground up.  In her first six seasons as head coach, she improved her program's record every year, winning the SEC in 2013–2014. In late 2014 her team achieved the program's first #1 ranking, making her only the second individual to both play on and coach a #1 ranked team. Staley has gone on to lead South Carolina to six SEC regular season championships, six SEC tournament championships, eight Sweet Sixteens, four Final Fours, and two NCAA Women's Basketball National Championships.

On April 2, 2020, Staley became the first person to win the Naismith Award as both a player and a coach. She also won the other three major National Coach of the Year awards after she led her team to a 32 win season and a final ranking of #1 in both major polls. 

Staley served as the United States women's national team head coach from 2017–2021, finishing with a perfect 45–0 record, before returning full time to South Carolina. In the 2020 Tokyo Olympics, Staley won her first gold medal as head coach for Team USA, and fourth overall, winning all six games.

On April 3, 2022, Staley led the Gamecocks to their 2nd national title with a 64–49 win over UConn, finishing the season 35–2 and being ranked #1 in both major polls for the entire season. Staley again would be named Naismith Award winner as the best coach in the nation for 2022.

Playing career

High school years
Staley was named the national high school player of the year during her final season at Murrell Dobbins Tech High School in Philadelphia.

College years
Staley attended the University of Virginia in Charlottesville, Virginia, from which she earned her degree in Rhetoric and Communication Studies. During her four seasons in college, she led her team to four NCAA Tournaments, three Final Fours and one National Championship game. She was named the ACC female athlete of the year and the national player of the year in 1991 and 1992. Staley finished her college career with 2,135 points and held the NCAA record for career steals with 454 (which has since been broken by current record holder, Natalie White). She finished her career at Virginia as the school's all-time scoring leader and as the ACC's all-time leader in assists at 729, but those records have since been broken by former UVA stars Monica Wright and Sharnee Zoll, respectively.  Her number 24 is retired at UVA.

In 1994–1995, after graduation, Staley played professional basketball in France in Tarbes, Italy, Brazil, and Spain before joining the ABL and then the WNBA.

USA Basketball
Staley was named to the USA Basketball Women's Junior National Team (now called the U19 team). The team participated in the second Junior World Championship, held in Bilbao, Spain, in July 1989. Team USA lost their opening game to South Korea in overtime, then lost a two-point game to Australia. After defeating Bulgaria, Team USA lost another close game, this time to Czechoslovakia by three points. The team followed that loss with a victory against Zaire, but dropped its final game to Spain, again by three points. Staley averaged 10.8 points per game and recorded 14 steals over the course of the event, both second-highest on the team. The Americans finished the tournament in seventh place. 

Staley was named to the team representing the United States at the World University Games held during July 1991 in Sheffield, England. While the American team had won gold in 1983, they finished with the silver in 1985, in fifth place in 1987, and did not field a team in 1989. The team was coached by Tara VanDerveer of Stanford. After winning opening games easily, Team USA faced China in the medal round. The Americans shot only 36% from the field, but limited the Chinese to just 35%, and advanced to the gold medal game by a score of 79–76. There they faced Spain, who had won all seven of their previous tournament games. However, Team USA defeated them easily, 88–62, to claim the gold medal. Staley averaged 4.9 points per game for the tournament. 

Staley competed with USA Basketball as a member of the 1992 Jones Cup Team that won the Gold in Taipei.

Staley played for Team USA throughout her career. In 1994 she competed in the World Championships and was named the USA basketball Female Athlete of the Year. She led the 1996 team to an undefeated record of 60–0 and the gold medal at the 1996 Atlanta Summer Olympics. She was also a member of the 2000 Olympic team that defended the gold medal.

Staley was selected to represent the United States at the 1995 USA Women's Pan American Games, but only four teams committed to participate, so the event was cancelled.

Staley was named to the United States national team in 1998. The national team traveled to Berlin, Germany, in July and August 1998 for the FIBA World Championships. Team USA won a close opening game against Japan, 95–89, then won their next six games easily. In the semifinal game against Brazil, Team USA was behind as much as ten points in the first half, but went on to win, 93–79. The gold medal game was a rematch against Russia. In the first game, the Americans dominated almost from the beginning, but in the rematch, Russia took the early lead and led much of the way. With under two minutes remaining, Team USA was down by two points, but rallied and then held on to win the gold medal by a score of 71–65. Staley hit two free throws with ten seconds left to extend a three-point lead to five, then hit another free throw with three seconds left in the game to seal the 71–65 victory. Staley averaged 7.0 points per game and made a record 52 assists.

In 2002, Staley was named to the national team which competed in the World Championships in Zhangjiagang, Changzhou, and Nanjing, China. The team was coached by Van Chancellor. Staley scored 4.9 points per game, and recorded a team-high 24 assists. Team USA won all nine games, including a close title game against Russia, with the teams separated by only one point late in the game.

She won a third gold medal with Team USA at the 2004 Games in Athens. Her Olympic performance led to her being named 2004 USA Basketball Female Athlete Of The Year at the end of the year. Before the Games, she was selected to carry the flag of the United States during the parade of nations at the opening ceremony.

ABL
In 1996, she joined the Richmond Rage of the American Basketball League (ABL) and led the team to the ABL finals in 1997. The following season, the team moved to Staley's hometown of Philadelphia. Staley was named the 1996–1997 All-ABL first team and the All-ABL second team, the following season.

WNBA
In the 1999 WNBA draft, Staley was selected with the ninth overall pick by the Charlotte Sting. In 2001, she led the Sting to the Championship game of the WNBA playoffs.

On August 1, 2005, Staley was traded to the Houston Comets. Staley announced before the start of the WNBA season that she would be retiring after the Comets' season was over. The Comets made the playoffs and faced the Sacramento Monarchs in the first round. The Monarchs swept the Comets and won the series 2–0, ending Staley's career. In 2011, she was voted in by fans as one of the Top 15 players in the fifteen-year history of the WNBA.

Coaching career

Temple Owls (2000–2008)
Staley had no interest in coaching when she was initially approached by the athletic director of Temple University, Dave O'Brien. She was on the Olympic team at the time which was attending the Final Four in Philadelphia. O'Brien, mindful that Staley was a Philadelphia native and star basketball player at Philadelphia's Dobbins Technical High School, talked her into visiting the campus, where she was guided to a conference room with a dozen people who were treating her visit as a job interview. When they asked her if she saw herself as a coach she replied "no, not at all". She initially resisted offers to become the coach. O'Brien changed his tactics and challenged her to identify some ways to turn the program around. She was still playing in the WNBA at the time and her friends told her it would be impossible to continue to play and coach. That challenge convinced her she should give coaching a try, and accepted the position of head coach at Temple. In her first season, 2000–01, Temple advanced to the WNIT. In 2001, 2002, and 2004, her teams won the Atlantic 10 tournament to qualify for the NCAA tournament.

In the 2004–05 season, Staley's Owls went 28–4, including a perfect 19–0 against Atlantic 10 opponents. However, they lost in the second round of the NCAA Tournament to Rutgers University. Staley reached the 100-win plateau in the A-10 Semifinals vs Xavier University that season, becoming the fastest coach in women's basketball to achieve that feat.

On May 7, 2008, it was confirmed by Temple University that Staley would leave Temple for the recently vacated coaching position at the University of South Carolina. She left Temple with the best overall record of 172–80, along with six NCAA appearances and four Atlantic 10 titles.

South Carolina Gamecocks (2008–present)
At South Carolina she started rebuilding a program from scratch, suffering through two losing seasons at the start of her tenure. Starting with 10 wins during the 2008–2009 season, she led the program to ever better finishes in each subsequent season, leading to the program's first number 1 ranking and Final Four appearance during the 2014–2015 season. They picked up where they left off a year later, going undefeated in SEC play; however, they were upended in the Sweet 16 by Syracuse.

In 2016–17, the Gamecocks repeated as SEC regular season and tournament champions for the third year in a row, and advanced to the second Final Four in school history. They defeated conference rival Mississippi State in the national championship game to win the first national title in school history. Staley became the second African American to lead a women's basketball team to a national championship; Carolyn Peck had coached Purdue to the 1999 national championship. After the 2017 win, The Post and Courier listed Staley first in their ranking of the 25 most powerful people in South Carolina sports.

Under Staley the program has captured five SEC regular season championships, six SEC tournament titles, three Final Fours, two NCAA National Championships, seven sweet sixteen appearances, five SEC player of the year awards and five SEC freshman of the year awards. Staley herself has been awarded SEC coach of the year five times.

In 2020, Staley led the Gamecocks to a 32–1 season, winning yet another SEC regular season, and tournament championship. The Gamecocks finished #1 in both major polls, before the NCAA Tournament was cancelled. Staley swept the National Coach of the year awards in 2020, she is the first person to win the Naismith award as a player, and also as a coach.

In 2021, Staley led her team to a third Final Four, before losing a controversial game to Stanford 66–65. Staley's Gamecocks signed the #1 class for the upcoming 2021–22 season. On October 15, 2021, Staley signed a massive seven-year, $22.4 million contract extension with South Carolina, making her the highest paid Black college basketball coach in the country.

In 2022 the Gamecocks were #1 in both polls for the entire season, they would go on to defeat 14 ranked teams, including Stanford, UConn, NC State Oregon, Maryland, Duke, LSU, Tennessee, and Georgia. In the NCAA tournament, the Gamecocks defeated Howard, Miami, North Carolina, Creighton, Louisville, and then UConn again. Staley is the first coach to defeat Geno Auriemma, Tara VanDerveer and Kim Mulkey in the same season. Staley was again named Naismith Award winner, and coached the National Player of the Year Aliyah Boston.

USA Basketball
Dawn Staley served as an assistant coach for the USA National team in 2006, a team in transition. Lisa Leslie, who had led the team in scoring in the 2004 Olympics, the 2002 World Championships, the 2000 Olympics, the 1998 World Championships, and the 1996 Olympics was no longer on the team. Sheryl Swoopes was available but hampered by injuries, with Staley transitioning from player to coach. Newcomers Sue Bird, Candace Parker and Diana Taurasi picked up the slack, but it was a team in transition. As an additional challenge, some members of the squad were unable to join the team for practices due to WNBA commitments. The team started out strong, winning each of the six preliminary games, including the game against Russia. In the quarterfinals, the USA team beat Spain 90–56. The semifinal was a rematch against Russia, but this time the Russian team prevailed, 75–68. The USA faced Brazil in the bronze medal game, and won easily 99–59.

During the 2008 Summer Olympics in Beijing, China, Staley served as an assistant coach under Team USA head coach Anne Donovan and helped the Americans win their fourth straight gold medal in women's basketball and sixth in their past seven Olympic appearances.

After coaching Team USA to a gold medal at the 2007 Pan Am games, she served as head coach to the U17 Team in 2014 and the U19 Team in 2015, winning gold medals at the U18 Americas Championship and the U19 FIBA World Championship. The USA basketball organization awarded her the code national coach of the year award as a result of the U 19 gold-medal. She shared the award with Sean Miller who coached the U19 men's team to a gold medal.

She served as an assistant coach under Team USA head coach Geno Auriemma for the 2016 Summer Olympics in Rio de Janeiro, Brazil, and helped the Americans win their sixth straight gold medal in women's basketball and eighth in their past nine Olympic appearances.

On March 10, 2017 she was named head coach of USA National team

At the 2020 Summer Olympics, Staley won her first Gold medal as Team USA's Head coach, winning all six games, and extending her record to 45–0; Staley has also coached Team USA to gold medals in the 2018 World Cup in Spain, and two gold medals in the 2019 and 2021 FIBA AmeriCup.

Awards and honors
 1991—Winner of the Honda Sports Award for basketball
 1991—WBCA Player of the Year
 1991—Naismith College Player of the Year
 1991—USBWA Women's National Player of the Year
 1991—The Honda-Broderick Cup winner for all sports.
 1992—Winner of the Honda Sports Award for basketball
 1992—WBCA Player of the Year
 1992—Naismith College Player of the Year
 1992—USBWA Women's National Player of the Year
 2008—Virginia Sports Hall of Fame
 2012—Inducted into the Women's Basketball Hall of Fame.
 2013—Order of the Palmetto
 2014—SEC Coach of the Year
 2015—SEC Co-Coach of the Year
 2015—USA Basketball Co-National Coach of the Year
 2016—SEC Coach of the Year
 2017—Omicron Delta Kappa faculty/staff initiate at the University of South Carolina
 2020—SEC Coach of the Year
 2020—Naismith College Coach of the Year
 2020—USBWA National Coach of the Year
 2020—AP National Coach of the Year
 2020—WBCA National Coach of the Year
 2021–USA Basketball Co-National Coach of the year
 2022—SEC Coach of the Year
 2022—USBWA Women's National Coach of the Year
 2022—Naismith College Coach of the Year
 2022—WBCA National Coach of the Year
 2023—SEC Coach of the Year

Career statistics

College
Source

WNBA

Regular season

|-
| align="left" | 1999
| align="left" | Charlotte
| 32 || 32 || 33.3 || .415 || .317 || .934 || 2.3 || 5.5 || 1.2 || 0.1 || 2.81 || 11.5
|-
| align="left" | 2000
| align="left" | Charlotte
| 32 || 32 || 34.3 || .372 || .330 || .878 || 2.4 || 5.9 || 1.2 || 0.0 || 2.84 || 8.8
|-
| align="left" | 2001
| align="left" | Charlotte
| 32 || 32 || 36.0 || .381 || .371 || .895 || 2.2 || 5.6 || 1.6 || 0.0 || 3.13 || 9.3
|-
| align="left" | 2002
| align="left" | Charlotte
| 32 || 32 || 33.2 || .364 || .398 || .762 || 1.8 || 5.1 || 1.5 || 0.0 || 2.50 || 8.7
|-
| align="left" | 2003
| align="left" | Charlotte
| 34 || 34 || 31.9 || .417 || .389 || .836 || 1.7 || 5.1 || 1.4 || 0.1 || 2.29 || 7.9
|-
| align="left" | 2004
| align="left" | Charlotte
| 34 || 34 || 33.6 || .431 || .407 || .759 || 1.7 || 5.0 || 1.3 || 0.1 || 2.18 || 8.9
|-
| align="left" | 2005*
| align="left" | Charlotte
| 23 || 23 || 29.7 || .405 || .405 || .767 || 2.3 || 5.3 || 1.3 || 0.0 || 1.83 || 6.3
|-
| align="left" | 2005*
| align="left" | Houston
| 10 || 3 || 22.1 || .357 || .286 || .900 || 1.7 || 2.8 || 0.6 || 0.1 || 1.20 || 3.3
|-
| align="left" | 2005
| align="left" | Totals
| 33 || 26 || 27.4 || .396 || .375 || .800 || 2.1 || 4.5 || 1.1 || 0.0 || 1.64 || 5.4
|-
| align="left" | 2006
| align="left" | Houston
| 34 || 34 || 29.9 || .420 || .427 || .806 || 2.2 || 3.9 || 1.0 || 0.2 || 2.24 || 7.4
|-
| align="left" | Career
| align="left" |8 years, 2 teams
| 263 || 256 || 32.4 || .399 || .376 || .824 || 2.0 || 5.1 || 1.3 || 0.1 || 2.44 || 7.5

Playoffs

|-
| align="left" | 1999
| align="left" | Charlotte
| 4 || 4 || 39.3 || .325 || .438 || .833 || 1.3 || 5.8 || 0.8 || 0.0 || 2.75 || 12.0
|-
| align="left" | 2001
| align="left" | Charlotte
| 8 || 8 || 37.6 || .416 || .500 || .810 || 2.3 || 4.4 || 1.1 || 0.3 || 4.25 || 11.8
|-
| align="left" | 2002
| align="left" | Charlotte
| 2 || 2 || 39.0 || .286 || .200 || .500 || 2.5 || 5.0 || 1.5 || 0.0 || 2.00 || 8.5
|-
| align="left" | 2003
| align="left" | Charlotte
| 2 || 2 || 29.0 || .353 || .500 || .400 || 2.5 || 3.5 || 2.0 || 0.0 || 2.00 || 9.0
|-
| align="left" | 2005
| align="left" | Houston
| 5 || 0 || 25.0 || .462 || .375 || .857 || 0.8 || 2.8 || 1.8 || 0.0 || 1.40 || 4.2
|-
| align="left" | 2006
| align="left" | Houston
| 2 || 2 || 20.0 || .143 || .333 || .000 || 2.5 || 1.0 || 0.0 || 0.0 || 2.00 || 1.5
|-
| align="left" | Career
| align="left" |6 years, 2 teams
| 23 || 18 || 33.0 || .366 || .423 || .754 || 1.8 || 4.0 || 1.2 || 0.1 || 2.78 || 8.7

Head coaching record

Personal life
Her parents, Clarence and Estelle Staley, moved to North Philadelphia from South Carolina in the 1950s, when they were still teenagers. They married young and in 1967 moved into a three-bedroom, single-bath row house, where they raised five children—three boys, Lawrence, Anthony, Eric, and two girls, Tracey, and their youngest daughter Dawn. Staley now heads the Dawn Staley Foundation, which gives middle-school children a positive influence in their lives by sponsoring an after-school program at the Hank Gathers Recreation Center.  The Center focuses on academics and athletics and sponsors basketball leagues and other fund-raising activities.

Staley owns a Havanese dog named Champ, who has his own Twitter account, and frequently visits practices.

Staley is a fan of the NFL’s Philadelphia Eagles. Throughout the 2022-2023 NFL season, Staley was often seen wearing their jerseys while coaching the Gamecocks.

See also
Lisa Leslie
Sheryl Swoopes

References

External links

1970 births
Living people
20th-century African-American sportspeople
20th-century African-American women
21st-century African-American sportspeople
21st-century African-American women
African-American basketball players
African-American sportswomen
All-American college women's basketball players
American expatriate basketball people in Brazil
American expatriate basketball people in France
American expatriate basketball people in Spain
American Olympic coaches
American women's basketball coaches
American women's basketball players
Basketball players at the 1996 Summer Olympics
Basketball players at the 2000 Summer Olympics
Basketball players at the 2004 Summer Olympics
Basketball coaches from Pennsylvania
Basketball players from Philadelphia
Charlotte Sting players
Houston Comets players
Medalists at the 1991 Summer Universiade
Medalists at the 1996 Summer Olympics
Medalists at the 2000 Summer Olympics
Medalists at the 2004 Summer Olympics
Naismith Memorial Basketball Hall of Fame inductees
Olympic gold medalists for the United States in basketball
Parade High School All-Americans (girls' basketball)
Philadelphia Rage players
Point guards
Richmond Rage players
South Carolina Gamecocks women's basketball coaches
Tarbes Gespe Bigorre players
Temple Owls women's basketball coaches
Universiade gold medalists for the United States
Universiade medalists in basketball
Virginia Cavaliers women's basketball players
Women's National Basketball Association All-Stars
United States women's national basketball team players